Fred Lyn Kendall (born January 31, 1949) is an American former professional baseball player and coach who appeared in 877 games, primarily as a catcher, in Major League Baseball from  to  for the San Diego Padres, Cleveland Indians and Boston Red Sox. He was born in Torrance, California.

Baseball career
He entered pro baseball after being selected in the fourth round of the 1967 Major League Baseball Draft out of Torrance High School by the Cincinnati Reds. After two strong seasons in Cincinnati's farm system, the brand-new Padres made Kendall their 14th selection in the 1968 Major League Baseball expansion draft.

In , he was voted the most-valuable Padre after setting career high marks in batting average (.282) and home runs (10).

In 877 games spanning 12 MLB seasons, Kendall collected 603 hits, with 86 doubles, 11 triples, 31 homers and 244 runs batted in. He hit .234 lifetime with an OPS of .598.

His son Jason, also a catcher, had a 15-year career in the majors ( to ) and was a two-time National League All-Star.

References

External links

1949 births
Living people
Asheville Tourists players
Baseball players from Torrance, California
Boston Red Sox players
Cleveland Indians players
Colorado Rockies (baseball) coaches
Detroit Tigers coaches
Elmira Pioneers players
Hawaii Islanders players
Kansas City Royals coaches
Major League Baseball bullpen coaches
Major League Baseball catchers
Salt Lake City Bees players
San Diego Padres players
Sioux Falls Packers players